Ming Tombs station, is a station on the Changping Line of the Beijing Subway. It was opened on 26 December 2015.

Despite being named after the Ming Tombs, the station itself is still 4 km away from the actual Ming Tombs Scenic Area, and has no other public transport access as of 2021 due to road conditions.

Station Layout 
The station has an underground island platform.

Exits 
There are 4 exits, lettered A, B, C, and D. Exit C is accessible.

See also
Ming Tombs
Ming Tombs Reservoir
Shisanling town

References

Railway stations in China opened in 2015
Beijing Subway stations in Changping District